Ingfried Hoffmann (born January 30, 1935) is a German jazz organist, pianist, trumpeter, arranger and composer. He has recorded for Columbia, Philips, Polydor, and Verve. He has composed music for German television, including music for the German version of Sesame Street and Robbi, Tobbi und das Fliewatüüt.

His album From Twen with Love (1966) was re-released as Hammond Bond in 2007. The title refers to the organ Hoffman used on songs influenced by the popularity of James Bond movies in the 1960s. The album includes songs from his 1963 album Hammond Tales.

References

Sources

External links
 

1935 births
Living people
German composers
German jazz organists
German male organists
German jazz pianists
German jazz trumpeters
Male trumpeters
21st-century trumpeters
German male pianists
21st-century pianists
21st-century organists
21st-century German male musicians
German male jazz musicians